, also known as Makuranodanshi, is a Japanese anime television series produced by Assez Finaud Fabric and Feel. It aired in Japan on 13 July 2015 and finished on 28 September 2015.

Premise
The series is a first-person story, with each weekly episode featuring one of 12 different "pillow boys" who sleep beside the viewer.

Characters
: Pillow boy. He is 8. He appeared in episode 1 and episode 12. His age changes in episode 12.
: Senpai boy. He is 32 years old. He appeared in episode 2.
: Music boy. He is 18 years old. He appeared in episode 3.
: Dialect boy. He is a 14 years old. He appeared in episode 4.
: Astronomy boy. He is a 20-year-old. He appeared in episode 5.
: Chūni boy. He is a 15-year-old. He appeared in episode 6. 
: Cherub boy. He is 5 years old. He appeared in episode 7. 
: Riajū boy. He is 21 years old. He appeared in episode 8.
: Librarian boy. He is a 28 years old. He appeared in episode 9. 
: Flower arrangement boy. He is 17 years old and Yayoi's twin brother. He appeared in episode 10 along with his twin brother.
: Flower arrangement boy. He is a 17 years old and Yonaga's twin brother. He appeared in episode 10 along with his twin brother.
: Yatai boy. He is a 41-year-old. He appeared in episode 11.

Production
The series was announced for a July release date in May 2015.  The series is animated by Assez Finaud Fabric and Feel and produced by Earth Star Entertainment, with writing by Yuniko Ayana and Ayumi Sekine, and character designs by Mika Yamamoto. The opening theme song, "Makura no Danshi", written by Masayoshi Ōishi, performed by voice actor Natsuki Hanae.

Broadcast and release
It aired on Tokyo MX and SUN-TV starting on 13 July 2015 and finished on 28 September 2015. The series was released on DVD on 27 November 2015. The DVD release will include an unaired episode. The series is streamed by Comic Earth Star, and will be simulcast by Crunchyroll in the United States, Canada, Central and South America, the United Kingdom and Ireland, the Nordics, Netherlands, South Africa, Australia, and New Zealand.

Episode list

References

External links
 Official anime website 
 

Feel (animation studio)
Earth Star Entertainment
Male harem anime and manga
Tokyo MX original programming